Zoheb is a given name. Notable people with the name include:

 Zoheb Hassan (born 1966), Pakistani singer, guitarist, producer, and director
 Zoheb Sharif (born 1983), English cricketer

See also
 Zohaib

Masculine given names